Albury railway station is a heritage-listed railway station at Railway Place, Albury, New South Wales, Australia, adjacent to the border with Victoria, in Australia. It was designed under the direction of John Whitton and built from 1880 to 1881. It was added to the New South Wales State Heritage Register in 1999.

History 
The railway precinct at Albury was the terminus for the Main Southern Line from 1881 until 1962. It remains as an operational railway yard and passenger station and is the last station before the NSW/Victoria border.

By the late 19th century, colonial rivalry between Victoria and NSW, particularly with regard to the competition for wool trade from the Riverina, was the catalyst for the rapid expansion of rail networks in both states in the direction of the Victoria/NSW border. In Victoria, a proposal for a line to Belvoir (Wodonga) was approved in 1869 and completed by 1873. In April 1873, John Sutherland, the Minister for Public Works, set out a policy to complete "the main trunk railways". The policy included the Great Southern Line and was in response to the threat that wool from the Riverina and the west would be diverted to Melbourne via river boats and the Victorian railway. By 1877, the Great Southern Railway extended from Sydney to as far as Cootamundra and rapidly continued on to Bethungra (1878), Junee (1878), Bomen (1878), Wagga Wagga (1879), and Gerogery (1880).

The construction contract for the Wagga Wagga to Albury section was awarded to George Cornwell & F. Mixner on 14 February 1878. The single line opened from Gerogery to Albury on 3 February 1881. The line finally reached the border with the extension across the Murray River on 14 June 1883 as a single track, the contract being awarded to Alex Frew on 1 May 1882.

The station and yard at Albury opened with a loop, stockyards, toilet, wool stage and a temporary platform on 1 March 1881. Albury and Wodonga were both used as change stations, with the interchange of passengers and goods to take place at Albury and livestock at Wodonga.

A contract for construction of a temporary station building, crew barracks, porters' cottages, Station Master's residence, and carriage shed at Albury was let to a J. Stevens in May 1880. In 1882, a 10 tonne crane and a cart weighbridge were installed, the temporary passenger platform converted to a loading stage, and the signal box moved from the temporary platform to a new location near the station.

On 26 February 1882, the new station building was opened. Designed in an Italianate style under the direction of John Whitton, the grandeur of the new building stood as a symbol of NSW's colonial pride. The premiers of both New South Wales and Victoria attended the official opening of the 1881 station, marking the first time in Australian history that two colonial premiers had appeared together publicly.

The New South Wales Government Railways were built to the standard gauge, which meant travellers in both directions had to change trains at Albury. This resulted in a  platform being built to accommodate that move, then the longest in Australia.

Early changes to the station precinct included construction of refreshment rooms, a goods shed and a temporary customs office in 1883, and an engine shed, new covered platform and new goods shed in 1884. In 1887, the station and southern end of the yard were interlocked and the southern yard remodelled. Other changes at Albury in the late 19th century included alterations to the barracks (1890), provision of a furnace for heating foot warmers (1890), provision of a special booking office on the platform for sleeping berth tickets for passengers from Victorian trains (1890), new drivers' barracks (1890), interlocking of the North Yard (1891), and the extension of the platform (1892 and 1902).

A contract for the construction of an engine shed, turntable pit, and coal stage was let to A. Frew in October 1880, with the original engine shed built as a two-track structure with the capacity to accommodate eight locomotives. The original 15.240m turntable was increased in size to 18.288m in 1904 and then to 22.860m in 1926.

Numerous changes were made to the station and yard in the 20th century, with some of the major alterations or additions including extension of the carriage shed (1905), extension of the platform and awning at the Country (southern) end (1907), erection of an additional carriage shed (1912), provision of an Institute building (1921), and extension of the awning (1944).

Major improvements were made to railway infrastructure at Albury and Wodonga during, and immediately prior to, World War II. The importance of improving railway links between states had been understood by military planners since Federation and became more acute after Japan entered World War II. The threat posed to coastal shipping by enemy ships and submarines, combined with restrictions on petrol and rubber, made rail transport increasingly important during the war. Rail traffic (for civilian and military purposes) increased significantly between Victoria and NSW during World War II with the number of passengers at Albury trebling from 1938 to 1941 and goods traffic increasing from 25,000 to 123,000 tonnes during the same period. The increased volume of traffic and the military presence at the border had significant implications for Albury with the Australian defence forces virtually commandeering the station for the duration of World War II.

Many changes were made to the station precinct and goods yard at Albury prior to and during World War II. Some of the major changes included the addition of a timber transhipment platform, lengthening of the station platform by 66m, and expansion of the goods yard on the western side of Parkinson Street. The railway transhipment platform remained in use after the war but activity within the Albury yard declined as road transport gradually displaced rail transport in the second half of the 20th century. Another important change was the introduction of standard gauge track between Wodonga and Melbourne in 1961, reducing the need for transhipment facilities at Albury, although not entirely as the transhipment platform remained in use after the introduction of standard gauge in Victoria. However, by the 1970s and 1980s some of the transhipment facilities at Albury were demolished (including the goods shed, wool depot and engine house) .

In April 1962, a new standard gauge line to Melbourne's Spencer Street station opened, and thus the Intercapital Daylight, Southern Aurora and Spirit of Progress began to operate without the need to change trains. However, the Riverina Express continued to terminate at Albury until November 1993, with passengers transferring to V/Line services to continue into Victoria.

The refreshment room closed in August 1975. The gatekeeper's residence was demolished in 1984 and the Institute building demolished in 1986. Railway residences at 528–538 Young Street and the railway barracks at 540 Young street were sold to private ownership and are no longer heritage listed. Conservation works were undertaken to the main station building in 1995. The goods shed, tripod crane and various other buildings and structures in the northern yard were demolished prior to 2000

The construction of the Hume Highway bypass in 2005 and 2006 involved the demolition of the Wilson Street footbridge and Dean Street overbridge, and modifications to the eastern end of the footbridge at the station.

Description

Station Building (1881)

A grand symmetrical Victorian Italianate style station building with a tall central tower topped with a decorative cupola. The building features load bearing brickwork with face brick and stuccoed and painted detail for pilasters, arches, quoins, pediments, string courses and architraves. The building has a pitched roof with hipped ends and hipped transverse bays at the ends of the building. The roof over the booking hall is elevated. The road-side of the building features the clock tower and two verandahs between the projecting bays supported on double cast iron columns. The platform side has a series of gabled roofs running at right angles to the main building; all supported on trusses over cast iron, decorated, fluted columns. Timber valances are still intact on the exterior of the building. The awning over the platform extension at the south end is of later design than the station building awning. The platform is covered for its entire length (and with Flinders St, Melbourne is the longest platform in Australia) .

Internally the building is arranged along the platform with a central booking hall and ticket office which contains most of its original cedar detailing and panelling. Opening off this space are a number of offices. Along the platform there is access to the ladies waiting room (divided into first and second class sections), the parcels office (also accessed from the street), stores, porters room, lamp room and male toilets. The stores and toilets are separated from the main building by a passageway and are under separate hipped roofs with dormer gables.

A refreshment room was added to the station building in the 1880s at the Sydney end of the main building and in a similar style to the main building. It has a separate awning structure of later construction which extends beyond the station building. Also the north end of the building has been extended by the addition of a second storey to provide additional accommodation space for the refreshment rooms.

Station Master's Residence (1881)

A large two-storey brick residence with a slate gabled roof. The building has an asymmetrical design with a projecting bay at the front and a two-storey verandah with decorative cast iron railing and detail to posts. The verandah roof is reverse curve corrugated iron. The arrangement of the building includes a sitting room and dining room with staircase in the front part of the ground floor area with attached kitchen, scullery and pantry at the rear. Upstairs there are two large bedrooms, one with closet, two smaller bedrooms, all with fireplaces and one very small bedroom under a lower roof, probably for a servant or used as a study.

Other station infrastructure

Heritage-listed infrastructure at the station also includes:
 Signal Box – elevated brick and timber with gabled roof located opposite platform (1885)
 Signal Box – brick, located at southern end of platform (1962)
 Station Master's residence – two-storey located at Railway Place (1881)
 Barracks, brick engine drivers' barracks at 508 Young Street
 Footbridge at northern end of platform
 Turntable
 Transhipment Shed (covered with central platform).
 Gantry cranes
 Broad gauge cripple sidings located in dock platform (interpretive display)

Condition 

As at 19 July 2013, the station buildings are in very good condition. Other structures are generally in good condition with some repairs required to the signal box and transhipment shed.

The station buildings, signal box and Station Master's residence have a high level of integrity/intactness.

Platforms & services

Albury is served by NSW TrainLink XPT services from Sydney Central to Melbourne Southern Cross services and terminating V/Line services to and from Melbourne Southern Cross.

Transport links

Greyhound Australia operates two services in both directions between Canberra and Melbourne, via Albury station.

NSW TrainLink operate road coach services from Albury station to Echuca.

V/Line operate road coach services from Albury station to Kerang, Adelaide, Canberra, Seymour and Wangaratta.

Heritage listings
The railway station, initially entered onto the now defunct Register of the National Estate on 21 March 1978, was transferred to the Australian National Heritage List on its establishment in 2012 and its scope widened to include the station and its associated yards with the following statement of significance:

On 2 April 1999 the Victorian Italianate railway station, signal box and station master's residence were collectively listed on the New South Wales State Heritage Register with the following statement of significance:

Gallery

See also

List of regional railway stations in New South Wales

References

Bibliography

Attribution

External links

Albury station details Transport for New South Wales
Rail Geelong gallery

Albury, New South Wales
Australian National Heritage List
Easy Access railway stations in New South Wales
Italianate architecture in New South Wales
John Whitton railway stations
New South Wales State Heritage Register
Railway stations in Australia opened in 1882
Regional railway stations in New South Wales
Main Southern railway line, New South Wales